Kirkland & Ellis LLP is an American multinational law firm headquartered in Chicago, Illinois. Founded in 1909, Kirkland & Ellis is the largest law firm in the world by revenue and the seventh-largest by number of attorneys, and was the first law firm in the world to reach US$4 billion in revenue. As of 2021, Kirkland & Ellis ranks third on Am Law's list of profits per equity partner. While Kirkland & Ellis was historically considered a firm focused on litigation, during the 2010s, it expanded private equity and restructuring practices which, together with large-scale commercial litigation, comprise the core legal service areas of the firm.

Many attorneys from the firm have served as federal officials or judges, including United States Supreme Court Justice Brett Kavanaugh and former Attorney General William Barr.

History 

In 1909, two attorneys, Stuart G. Shepard and Robert R. McCormick, formed the Chicago-based partnership that would eventually become Kirkland & Ellis. McCormick was the grandson of Joseph Medill, who had founded the Chicago Tribune. McCormick became president of the Tribune Company in 1914 and, in 1925, sole publisher of the Tribune.

Weymouth Kirkland and his associate Howard Ellis joined the firm in 1915. Kirkland served as chief counsel to the Tribune and other newspapers in various free speech and defamation cases, including Near v. Minnesota. In 1938, Kirkland and Ellis hired young trial lawyer Hammond Chaffetz from the U.S. Department of Justice. Chaffetz spent six decades with the firm, during which it grew to about 780 lawyers, making it one of the 30 largest in the country. Kirkland & Ellis has 15 offices in four countries.

In 2020, "Kirkland, along with some other out-of-town firms like Sidley Austin and Latham & Watkins," have been reported in media as using "aggressive lateral recruiting to draw from New York's dealmaking talent pool." The firm earned just under $5 billion in revenue in 2020. The increase came from heightened demand, induced by the COVID-19 pandemic.

Rankings
The American Lawyer ranked Kirkland & Ellis as the 2018 Law Firm of the Year. "Mergers & Acquisitions" ranked Kirkland & Ellis as the 2019 Law Firm of the Year for advising on 400 U.S. based-deals (more than twice that of the firm ranked second), and for advising on the largest number of global deals, in each case, in 2019. As of 2021, Am Law lists Kirkland & Ellis as the largest law firm in the United States by gross revenue and third greatest in profits per equity partner. Kirkland & Ellis was ranked second in the 2017 ATL Power 100 law firm rankings. Vault ranked Kirkland & Ellis as the most prestigious firm in Chicago and the number-one firm in the U.S. for private equity, restructuring and business outlook in 2018.

Notable clients and cases 
Brown & Williamson, a tobacco company. In 1995, Kirkland & Ellis made legal threats against CBS to prevent it from airing a 60 Minutes interview with tobacco industry whistleblower Jeffrey Wigand.
Bristol-Myers Squibb in its US$90 billion acquisition of Celgene, the largest biopharmaceutical deal in history by terms of transaction value
AbbVie in its US$63 billion acquisition of Allergan, which received the New York 2020 Healthcare, Pharma & Biotech Deal of the Year award by The Deal (magazine).
 GLP (company) in its sale of U.S. Logistics Business to Blackstone for US$18.7 billion, the largest ever private real estate transaction globally in terms of trade value
 BP in relation to the 2010 Deepwater Horizon oil spill; secured a summary judgment ruling in favor of BP that it had no duty to report the Deepwater Horizon oil spill under the U.S. Emergency Planning and Community Right-to-Know Act
 Volkswagen in relation to the Volkswagen emissions scandal
 General Motors in relation to the General Motors ignition switch scandal
 Defended Nike, Inc. against trademark infringement claims regarding the Jumpman logo
 AbbVie Inc., pharmaceutical company spun-off from Abbott Laboratories in 2013, in a royalty dispute with MedImmune; won a  $93.8 million jury award
 MedTronic in a patent suit won against Atlas IP, LLC
 Miller UK Ltd., acquired a $73.6 million trade secrets misappropriation jury award against Caterpillar Inc.
 Jeffrey Epstein in a case of sex-trafficking with minors, resulting in a reduced charge plea bargain with limited penalties, which later garnered "accusations that the lenient sentence enabled Epstein to continue his abuse." Evaded legal obligation to notify victims of the plea bargain, thereby violating victims rights under the CVRA, by holding secret meetings with Alex Acosta's staff in the Marriott hotel
 Toys R Us restructuring
 A group of major investors in the international fish meal industry, in connection with their claims against China Fishery
 Cariol Horne 2020 action for reinstatement to the Buffalo Police Department, having been fired in 2008 for intervening in an arrest that she perceived as being potentially lethal
Kirkland & Ellis represented Boeing in relation to the Boeing 737 MAX disaster. Controversially, the U.S. Attorney in the case, Erin Nealy Cox, let Boeing executives off the hook for their role in the disaster in the prosecution agreement signed by her and Kirkland & Ellis. She was subsequently made a partner at Kirkland & Ellis.

Pro bono work 
The firm represented separated families, asylum seekers and other migrants, and nationwide class of immigrant teens held in ICE detention centers, in opposition to Trump administration family separation policy.

Kirkland attorney Michael D. Jones represented alumni and supporters of Maryland’s historically Black colleges and universities (HBCUs) in a 15-year legal battle against the State of Maryland. The case, brought in federal court, claimed that the state had systemically underfunded the schools for decades. The matter was finally settled in 2021 when lawmakers approved $577 million in extra funding for the HBCUs in future state budgets. As part of the settlement, the state of Maryland agreed to pay $22 million in legal fees and costs, with $12.5 million going to Kirkland & Ellis. The remaining $9.5 million went to the Lawyers’ Committee for Civil Rights Under the Law, which also provided legal representation for plaintiffs in the lawsuit. Kirkland’s $12.5 million portion of the fees was later donated by the firm to a series of organizations that benefitted HBCUs and promoted civil rights. The allocation of fees included: $5 million to the Center for Racial Justice at Dillard University in New Orleans; $3 million to Morgan State University’s Robert M. Bell Center for Civil Rights in Education; $2 million for the Lawyers’ Committee for Civil Rights Under the Law; $1 million to the National Association for Equal Opportunity in Higher Education; $600,000 to Howard University’s Thurgood Marshall Civil Rights Center; $600,000 to the Coalition for Equity and Excellence in Maryland Higher Education; and $250,000 to the African Methodist Episcopal Church Second District.

Notable attorneys and alumni 
Notable alumni of the firm include, among others, more than two dozen attorneys who resigned when appointed to roles in government. Alumni include:
 Alexander Acosta – former Secretary of Labor under President Donald Trump
 Alex Azar – Secretary of Health and Human Services
William Barr – 85th United States Attorney General under President Donald Trump and former 77th United States Attorney General under President George H. W. Bush
 John Bolton – former National Security Advisor under President Donald Trump
 Robert Bork – former Judge of the Court of Appeals for the D.C. Circuit and former Solicitor General under President Richard Nixon
 Daniel Bress – Judge on the United States Court of Appeals for the Ninth Circuit
Rubén Castillo – former United States District Judge for United States District Court for the Northern District of Illinois
 Pat Cipollone – White House Counsel under President Donald Trump
Jeffrey Clark – United States Assistant Attorney General for the Environment and Natural Resources Division under President Donald Trump; acting head of the Civil Division under President Donald Trump. Clark aided Trump in his unsuccessful efforts to overturn the 2020 election results.
 Paul Clement – former Solicitor General under President George W. Bush In June 2022, following his clients' Supreme Court victory in New York State Rifle & Pistol Association, Inc. v. Bruen, Clement separated from Kirkland & Ellis, after the firm announced it would "no longer handle Second Amendment litigation". Subsequently, Clement opened a boutique law firm, Clement & Murphy PLLC, with Erin Murphy, another former partner at Kirkland & Ellis.
 Viet D. Dinh – Chief Legal Officer at 21st Century Fox, former Assistant Attorney General under President George W. Bush and chief architect of the USA PATRIOT Act
John C. Eastman – former professor at Chapman University School of Law who advised President Donald Trump on the legal strategy to overturn the 2020 presidential election. 
 Neil Eggleston – former White House Counsel under President Barack Obama
 Mark Filip – former Judge of the District Court for the Northern District of Illinois and former Deputy Attorney General under President George W. Bush
Josh Hammer – Newsweek opinion editor, syndicated columnist, and host of The Josh Hammer Show
Brett Kavanaugh – Associate Justice of the Supreme Court of the United States
 Robert Khuzami – Deputy United States Attorney for the Southern District of New York, former Director of the Division of Enforcement of the Securities and Exchange Commission and former General Counsel of Deutsche Bank
Raja Krishnamoorthi – U.S. Representative from Illinois's 8th congressional district
 Christopher Landau – former US Ambassador to Mexico under President Donald Trump
 Jay Lefkowitz – former Special Envoy for Human Rights in North Korea and Director of Cabinet Affairs under President George W. Bush
Lisa Madigan – former Illinois Attorney General from 2003 to 2019
Sean Patrick Maloney – former U.S. Representative from New York's 18th congressional district
 Dallin H. Oaks – First Counselor of the First Presidency of the Church of Jesus Christ of Latter-day Saints
 Jeffrey A. Rosen – Deputy Secretary of Transportation and Deputy Attorney General and acting United States Attorney General under President Donald Trump
 Nathan Sales – Coordinator for Counterterrorism and Acting Under Secretary for Civilian Security, Democracy, and Human Rights
 Mikie Sherrill – U.S. Representative for 
 Ken Starr – Whitewater special prosecutor and former Solicitor General under President George H. W. Bush
 Jeff Wall – Principal Deputy Solicitor General under President Donald Trump and former acting Solicitor General
 Ali Zaidi – first deputy White House National Climate Advisor in U.S. history (under President Joe Biden)

Endowed professorships
The firm has endowed professorships in its name at four law schools: Harvard Law School, Northwestern University School of Law, University of Michigan Law School, and the University of Chicago Law School.

See also
List of largest law firms by revenue
List of largest law firms by profits per partner

References

Further reading

External links
Firm website

Law firms based in Chicago
Law firms established in 1909
Insolvency and corporate recovery firms
1909 establishments in Illinois
Foreign law firms with offices in Hong Kong